"Lovin' Lately" is a song by American country music duo Big & Rich featuring Tim McGraw. It was released in January 2016 as the third single from Big & Rich's third studio album, Gravity. The song was written by duo members Big Kenny and John Rich and McGraw.

Critical reception
An uncredited Taste of Country review of the song was positive, saying that "Sharp storytelling and a strong bridge make this song the finest release yet from Gravity."

Commercial performance
The song first entered the Hot Country Songs at No. 48 for chart dated March 12, 2016, and peaked at No. 19 on the chart for October 15, 2016. The song has sold 125,000 copies as of October 2016.

Music video
The music video was released as part of the Gravity Quadrilogy and stars McGraw as the bartender. It was directed by Trey Fanjoy.

Chart performance

Weekly charts

Year end charts

References

2014 songs
2016 singles
Country ballads
2010s ballads
Big & Rich songs
Tim McGraw songs
Vocal collaborations
Songs written by Big Kenny
Songs written by John Rich
Songs written by Tim McGraw
Song recordings produced by John Rich
Music videos directed by Trey Fanjoy